SNN may refer to:

 Shannon Airport (Ireland), whose IATA airport code is SNN
 Simulated neural network or static neural network, another term for an artificial neural network
 Spiking neural network, a type of artificial neural network
 Spatial neural network, another type of artificial neural network
 SNN (gene), a human gene encoding the protein stannin
 SNN: Student News Network, an Iranian news agency running in Tehran, Iran
 SNN: Suncoast News Network, a 24/7 local news operation running in Sarasota, Florida
 SNN: Showbiz News Ngayon, a Philippine news show for the showbiz
 Sun News Network, a Canadian 24h news network
 Suncoast News Network, also known as WSNN-LD, an independent television station (channel 39) licensed to Sarasota, Florida, United States
 Sarimanok News Network, a Philippine 24/7 News Channel since 1996, Now ABS-CBN News Channel